Delores Winters is a DC Comics character, originally named Dolores Winters. Until recently her main role in DC Universe history has been as a body occupied by the Ultra-Humanite in the 1940s, but she has made more significant appearances in current continuity.

Delores Winters appears in the third and final season of The CW network television series Stargirl, portrayed by Meredith Garretson.

Fictional character biography
In the early 1940s Delores was a rare beauty − a rising star on the silver screen who might have been legend with just a few more well-chosen parts. She had had a sexual indiscretion while simply an aspiring actress but did not choose an abortion, instead, she had given birth to a healthy daughter and had given her up, she then commenced her career in earnest. Her last Hollywood project was the 12-part serial produced by Stellar Pictures, Monkey Trouble, where she co-starred with Garrett Fairfield. She was kidnapped by the Ultra-Humanite for the purpose of a body swap. Brain surgery was undertaken and the villain's brain was placed into the cranium of the actress. The Ultra-Humanite did not give the real Delores Winters a second thought, he simply cast her aside and continued with his own maniacal designs which included gathering together powerful talismans, capturing the Justice Society of America, and ruling the world; of the last goal, at least, he was unsuccessful. Pre-Crisis the Ultra-Humanite claimed to be retiring, but took a group of celebrities on the ship Sea Serpent hostage, asking for a ransom of $5,000,000. However, Superman rescued them, though Ultra-Humanite escaped. Ultra-Humanite in Delores' body abducts an atomic scientist named Terry Curtis and plans to use an atomic missile to blackmail the city of Metropolis. The plot was thwarted by Superman, but Ultra-Humanite got away during the destruction of his lair.

Ultra-Humanite in Delores' body later turned Terry Curtis into Cyclotron and Jake Simmons into Deathbolt in his plot only to be thwarted by the All-Star Squadron.

Ultra-Humanite in Delores' body later tried to capture Bruce Wayne so that he would serve as Ultra-Humanite's next body. This plot was thwarted by Superman.

All who knew of Miss Winters' abduction believed her dead. The truth, however, was that Ultra-Humanite who assisted the megalomaniacal genius had other plans for the actress. He had seen all of the actress' movies and thought of himself as a fan, and so he preserved her brain as only he knew how, and sought out a new body for her. He found one in a recent suicide at Our Lady of Snows' General Hospital. The reaction of the "saved" Miss Winters was far from grateful. She asked for death or for a prettier body. Whether Dolores Winters had always been vain is not recorded, perhaps the cause of her callous disregard for her new body and that of others was simply the result of the shock of having her brain, and her essence, taken forcibly out of her own body and placed into that of a stranger. Regardless, she regained her life with a great sense of loss - of her identity, of the life she felt she deserved - and with the aid of Doctor Marten, she began a series of surgeries aimed at taking the ugly body of the suicide and transforming it into something beautiful. Delores Winters became intimate with reconstructive surgery and though it was painful she was a woman with a driven obsession. Yet all bodies age, even reconstructed ones. Sometime in the 1950s or 1960s, Miss Winters had Doctor Marten locate and abduct her daughter, now a young and beautiful woman. Delores had her brain transplanted, and it was her daughter this time who was cast aside and left to die. She continued to have cosmetic surgeries as she lived her life of ease and wealth. Some time during the 2000s, however, she decided to repair her aging skin by having a full transplant - and as a donor she chose the heroine Icemaiden. She paid Warp to kidnap Icemaiden and then had Doctor Marten conduct the surgery. In the end Delores Winters had new alabaster skin while the heroine had been flayed alive. Icemaiden did not die and eventually was placed, comatose, into a hydration womb within a facility of S.T.A.R. Labs. By the 2000s Delores Winters was owner and operator of a spa/clinic that specialized in cosmetic surgeries, she was also calling herself Endless Winter. Covertly she worked with Roulette, another businesswoman who just happened to specialize in fight club gambling - with the fighters being heroes forced into knock-down, drag-out, kill-or-be-killed matches. The losers of these brutal fights would be given over to Winters and her doctors, their body parts would be sold to and implanted into clients who bought into the lure of youth, vitality, and that little extra rush of power that comes from being a metahuman.

Her clinic was infiltrated by Doctor Mid-Nite who was then captured. He escaped and went after Winters. In the ensuing fight the clinic and spa was damaged while Delores Winters lost control of her own metahuman skin. She began causing snow and ice to form and blow within the confines of the clinic and even began freezing over her own body. In the battle with Doctor Mid-Nite, her right arm from the elbow down was snapped off, but she escapes into the night.

Some time later, Delores travels to Gotham City and attacks Batwoman. After she is defeated, Delores suddenly collapses and dies from an unknown cause. Her corpse is taken by the Justice League and it is revealed that she had been forced by Prometheus to attack Batwoman in order to distract her from his true goal. Despite the injury suffered at Mid-Nite's hands, Delores still appears having both her arms intact.

Powers and abilities
Delores Winters recently had a complete skin graft from the heroine Icemaiden (due to cosmetic surgery). This skin has the ability to manipulate moisture and temperature in her environment, which she can create ice or cold. Miss Winters also has a little control of these powers, but not to any degree. She is a skilled actress, businesswoman, and entrepreneur.

Legends of the DC Universe
An actress named Delores Winters appeared as the girlfriend of Lex Luthor in post-Crisis continuity. Superman fights a new U.L.T.R.A. Humanite, a scientist who can transfer his consciousness into other bodies and seeks revenge on Luthor. Luthor attempts to kill Winters, believing (wrongly) she has been possessed by the Humanite, but she is saved by Superman.

In other media
Delores Winters appears in the Stargirl episode "Frenemies: Chapter Twelve: The Last Will and Testament of Sylvester Pemberton", portrayed by Meredith Garretson. Her history of her body being used by Ultra-Humanite remains intact before he and Dragon King planned to place his brain into an albino gorilla that was discovered by Congo Bill.

References

Characters created by Jerry Siegel
Characters created by Joe Shuster
Comics characters introduced in 1940
DC Comics female characters
DC Comics metahumans
Fictional actors
Fictional businesspeople
Fictional characters with ice or cold abilities